Marthinus Wessel Pretorius  (17 September 1819 – 19 May 1901) was a South African political leader. An Afrikaner (or "Boer"), he helped establish the South African Republic (Zuid-Afrikaansche Republiek or ZAR; also referred to as Transvaal), was the first president of the ZAR, and also compiled its constitution.

He was born in Cape Colony, then accompanied his father, the Voortrekker leader Andries Pretorius in the migration to the interior.
After the death of his father in 1853, he was appointed to succeed him as Commandant-General of the Boer settlers around the city of Potchefstroom and moved from his farm, Kalkheuwel, near Broederstroom, to Potchefstroom. He was Commandant-General of Potchefstroom from 1853 through 1856.

Political offices 

In 1857, the nascent ZAR elected Pretorius as its first President. However, in 1859, in an effort to create closer bonds with the Orange Free State, he also became State President of the Orange Free State. This created tension in the ZAR, and in 1860, he resigned as President of the ZAR. After serving as President of the Orange Free State until 1863, Pretorius was re-elected President of the ZAR in 1864, and served a second term until 1871. Pretorius also served as joint head of state (in the "triumvirate") between 1880 and 1883.

He died on 19 May 1901 at Potchefstroom.

Pretorius was an important South African Freemason.

Founding of the city of Pretoria 

In an endeavour to establish a new town, he bought two farms named Elandspoort and Daspoort between 1854 and 1855, on which he founded the city of Pretoria in 1855.

Ds. van der Hoff originally named the first church congregation in this area Pretoria Philadelphia (Pretorius Friendship), in honour of Pretorius' father. Later, the town took on the shortened name of Pretoria.

Five years later the capital of the ZAR was moved from Potchefstroom to Pretoria.

References

Presidents of the South African Republic
State Presidents of the Orange Free State
1819 births
1901 deaths
Afrikaner people
People from the Eastern Cape
South African people of Dutch descent
South African Republic politicians
1850s in the South African Republic
1860s in the South African Republic
1860s in Transvaal
1880s in Transvaal
19th-century South African people
History of Pretoria
South African Freemasons
City founders